National Highway 516D, commonly referred to as NH 516D is a national highway in  India. It is a spur road of National Highway 16. NH-516D traverses the state of Andhra Pradesh in India.

Route 

Deverapalli Bypass, Golladgudem, Gopalapuram, Jaganathapuram, Atchyutapuram, Koyyalgudem, Bayyanagudem, Seetampeta, Narasannapalem, Jangareddigudam, Vegavaram, Taduvai, Darbhagudem, Jeelugumilli.

Junctions  

  Terminal near Devarapalle.

See also 

 List of National Highways in India
 List of National Highways in India by state

References

External links 

 NH 516D on OpenStreetMap

National highways in India
National Highways in Andhra Pradesh